Polyalthiopsis verrucipes is a species of plant in the Annonaceae family. It is endemic to China.

References

verrucipes
Endemic flora of China
Endangered plants
Taxonomy articles created by Polbot